Nie Zaiping from the University of Electronic Science and Technology of China (UESTC), Chengdu, Sichuan, China was named Fellow of the Institute of Electrical and Electronics Engineers (IEEE) for the IEEE Antennas & Propagation Society in 2013 for leadership in engineering and education in electromagnetics.

References 

Fellow Members of the IEEE
Academic staff of the University of Electronic Science and Technology of China
Chinese engineers
Living people
Year of birth missing (living people)